Dmitry Mikhailovich Shikin (born August 28, 1991) is a Russian professional ice hockey goaltender. He is currently playing with HC Vityaz of the Kontinental Hockey League (KHL).

Shikin made his Kontinental Hockey League debut playing with SKA Saint Petersburg during the 2013–14 KHL season.

References

External links

1991 births
Living people
Amur Khabarovsk players
Atlant Moscow Oblast players
Avtomobilist Yekaterinburg players
EHC Biel players
Buran Voronezh players
Dizel Penza players
Kristall Elektrostal players
HC Kunlun Red Star players
Russian ice hockey goaltenders
SKA Saint Petersburg players
SKA-1946 players
HC Sochi players
HC Vityaz players
Yermak Angarsk players